The 2009 Asian Youth Para Games, officially known as the 1st Asian Youth Para Games,  was an Asian youth disabled multi-sport event held in Tokyo, Japan from 10 to 13 September 2009. Around 466 athletes from 29 participating nations participated at the games which featured 6 sports consisted of 5 main sports and 1 demonstration sport.

This was the first time Japan hosted the games. Japan is the first nation to host the Asian Youth Para Games. The games was opened and closed by Akihito at the Tokyo Metropolitan Gymnasium.

The final medal tally was led by host Japan, followed by Iran and China.

Organisation

Development and preparation

The Tokyo 2009 Asian Youth Para Games Organising Committee (TAYPOC) was formed to oversee the staging of the games.

Venues

The games

Participating nations

 (x)

 (x)

 (x)
 (x)

 (x)

 (x)

Guest participating nations
Play only demonstration sport: Wheelchair tennis

Sports

Main sport
  Athletics 
  Badminton
  Boccia
  Swimming 
  Table tennis 

Demonstration sport
Athletes of this sport are not entitled to win medals, specially for guest participating nations.
  Wheelchair tennis

Medal table

See also
2009 Asian Youth Games
Tokyo bid for the 2016 Summer Olympics

References

External links

Asian Youth Para Games
Asian Youth Para Games, 2009
Youth sport in Japan
2009 in Asian sport
Asian Youth Para Games
Multi-sport events in Japan
International sports competitions hosted by Japan
Sports competitions in Tokyo
2009 in Tokyo
2009 in youth sport
September 2009 sports events in Japan